Tariq Pervez Khan (15 February 1948 – 18 April 2020) was the Chief Justice of Peshawar High Court in Pakistan. He was later elevated to the Supreme Court from where he retired in February 2013. He also served as the caretaker chief minister of Khyber Pakhtunkhwa from March 20, 2013 to May 31, 2013. He has also been acting governor twice during the tenure of Governor Ali Muhammad Jan Orakzai. On November 10, 2014, he was nominated as chief election commissioner of Pakistan.

Biography
Tariq was born on 15 February 1948 in Sikander Town, Peshawar. Tariq Pervez obtained a law degree from Law College Peshawar University in 1971 and a political science degree from the University of Peshawar in 1975. Tariq had been associated with the law profession for the past four decades. He started advocating with the Peshawar District Court in 1972 and obtained the license of the Peshawar High Court in 1975. Tariq became a Supreme Court lawyer in 1983 after advocating for the High Court for eleven years. Tariq became the Peshawar High Court judge in 1997 while in April 2005 he was promoted to the Chief Justice of the Peshawar High Court.

He refused to take oath under the PCO on November 3, 2007, after Pervez Musharraf imposed an emergency in the country. Tariq Pervez was re-appointed Chief Justice of the Peshawar High Court on September 5, 2008 under the PCO's Chief Justice Abdul Hameed Dogar and was made a Supreme Court Judge on October 20, 2009.

Tariq Pervez retired on February 14, 2013 at the age of 65. He had three daughters and a son.

He died on 18 April 2020.

References

Pakistani judges
1948 births
2020 deaths
Justices of the Supreme Court of Pakistan
Chief Ministers of Khyber Pakhtunkhwa
Chief Justices of the Peshawar High Court
People from Peshawar